Caesium sulfate or cesium sulfate is the inorganic compound and salt with the formula Cs2SO4. It is a white water-soluble solid that is used to prepare dense aqueous solutions for use in isopycnic (or "density-gradient") centrifugation.  It is isostructural with potassium salt.

References

External links
Caesium sulfate data sheet from Chemetall

Caesium compounds
Sulfates